Jaime L. Mariano OLY (are post-nominal letters granted by the World Olympians Association (WOA) to registered athletes who have participated in the Olympic Games (born April 19, 1941), also known as Jimmy "Mr. Cool" Mariano''', is a Filipino former basketball player and coach. Mariano was born in Malabon, Rizal, Philippines. Standing at 6'3 1/2" without shoes, he played primarily the power forward position and could play the small forward and center positions. He became famous as a player for the UE Red Warriors team under Coach Baby Dalupan. He played for Ysmael Steel, Meralco and Concepcion Industries in the Manila Industrial and Commercial Athletic Association. He became known as a deadly shooting big man from the outside before the three point line was popularized.  He was elevated to the Philippine Basketball Association in 1975 with Concepcion Carrier.  He played for 7 Up from 1976 to 1977. The 7-Up franchise was acquired in 1978 by Filmanbank and Mariano played his final season with Filmanbank. He is the pride and joy of the Marianos of Malabon.

Mariano also appeared at the Olympic Games as a member of the country's national basketball team and 1968 Olympics in Mexico City, Mexico. Mariano was the flag bearer of the Philippines at the 1972 Summer Olympics in Munich, Germany.

Mariano began his coaching career in 1981 with Presto Fun Drinks in the PBA. He also coached Red Bull in the Philippine Basketball League. In 1990, he returned to Presto and led the team to the 1990 All-Filipino championship, his only PBA title.

References

External links
 

1941 births
Filipino men's basketball coaches
Great Taste Coffee Makers coaches
Olympic basketball players of the Philippines
Basketball players at the 1968 Summer Olympics
Basketball players at the 1972 Summer Olympics
Living people
UE Red Warriors basketball players
People from Malabon
Basketball players from Metro Manila
Basketball players at the 1966 Asian Games
Basketball players at the 1970 Asian Games
Basketball players at the 1974 Asian Games
Philippines men's national basketball team players
Filipino men's basketball players
1974 FIBA World Championship players
Power forwards (basketball)
Centers (basketball)
Asian Games competitors for the Philippines